Antalya Aksu Science High School was founded in 1940. It is considered one of the best Anatolian High Schools in Turkey. The education in this school is mostly in Turkish. The first foreign language is English and the second foreign language is German.

The name of the school has been changed to Antalya Aksu Science High School in 2014.

References

High schools in Turkey
Educational institutions established in 1940
Education in Antalya
1940 establishments in Turkey
Science High Schools in Turkey